Dimonim Air is a national airline in Indonesia, with services that are "chartered airlines." It has an air base at Sentani International Airport, and its head office is on Jl. Cidurian No.6 Cikini, Central Jakarta.

History 

The company began operating in 2008 using Korean Kamov Ka-32A helicopters.

Destinations

Dimonim Air operates charter & freighter services with a focus on Indonesian destinations, providing transportation linkages in Indonesia. Scheduled destinations include:

Sumatra
Batam - Hang Nadim Airport

Kalimantan
Ketapang - Rahadi Osman Airport

Maluku
Ternate - Sultan Babullah Airport

Papua
Jayapura - Sentani International Airport
Wamena - Wamena Airport
Nabire - Nabire Airport
Dekai - Nop Goliat Dekai Airport
Elelim - Elelim Airport
Karubaga - Karubaga Airport
Sinak Sinak Airstrip
Ilaga - Ilaga Airport
Beoga - Beoga Airfield
Mulia - Mulia-Puncak Jaya Airport
Ilu - Ilu Airport
Mamit - Mamit Landing Strip
Bokondini - Bokondini Airport
Kobakma - Kobakma Airport
Pasema - Pasema Airport
Anggruk - Anggruk Airport
Faowi - Faowi Airport
Kenyam - Kenyam Airport
Paro - Paro Airfield

Future destinations 
 Pangandaran - Cijulang Nusawiru Airport
 Palopo - Bua Airport
 Kepulauan Aru - Benjina Airport
 Rokan Hulu - Tuanku Tambusai Airport
 Mandailing Natal - Bukit Malintang Airport
 Muara Bungo - Muara Bungo Airport
 Samarinda - Aji Pangeran Tumenggung Pranoto International Airport
 Sabu Raijua - Tardamu Airport
 Maumere - Frans Seda Airport
 Sumbawa Besar - Sultan Muhammad Kaharuddin III Airport
 Gorontalo - Jalaluddin Airport
 Rengat - Japura Airport
 Jember - Notohadinegoro Airport
 Sumenep - Trunojoyo Airport

Fleet 
 Dimonim Air  has several aircraft, including:

Accidents and incidents
 August 11, 2018 - A PAC 750XL aircraft of Dimonim Air registration PK-HVQ is reported missing on a flight between Tanah Merah Airport and Oksibil Airport, Papua, Indonesia. The flight should have a duration of 42 minutes but failed to arrive at Oksibil. Search operations are being conducted. Some people in a village reported they heard loud sounds and an explosion. There were two pilots and seven passengers aboard. The wreckage of the plane was located near Oksibil Airport. Eight occupants died in the crash, a boy was the only survivor.

References 

Airlines of Indonesia
Airlines established in 2012
Indonesian companies established in 2012